The 1956 Ole Miss Rebels baseball team represented the University of Mississippi in the 1956 NCAA baseball season. The Rebels played their home games at Swayze Field. The team was coached by Tom Swayze in his 6th year as head coach at Ole Miss.

The Rebels won the District III to advance to the College World Series, where they were defeated by the Arizona Wildcats.

Roster

Schedule

! style="" | Regular Season
|- valign="top" 

|- bgcolor="#ccffcc"
| 1 || March  ||  || Swayze Field • Oxford, Mississippi || 9–6 || 1–0 || –
|- bgcolor="#ccffcc"
| 2 || March  || Delta State || Swayze Field • Oxford, Mississippi || 21–1 || 2–0 || –
|- bgcolor="#ccffcc"
| 3 || March  ||  || Swayze Field • Oxford, Mississippi || 4–1 || 3–0 || –
|- bgcolor="#ffcccc"
| 4 || March  || Illinois Wesleyan || Swayze Field • Oxford, Mississippi || 10–12 || 3–1 || –
|- bgcolor="#ffcccc"
| 5 || March 30 ||  || Swayze Field • Oxford, Mississippi || 1–2 || 3–2 || 0–1
|- bgcolor="#ccffcc"
| 6 || March 31 || LSU || Swayze Field • Oxford, Mississippi || 8–6 || 4–2 || 1–1
|- bgcolor="#ccffcc"
| 7 || March 31 || LSU || Swayze Field • Oxford, Mississippi || 11–0 || 5–2 || 2–1
|-

|-
! style="" | Postseason
|- valign="top" 

|- bgcolor="#ccffcc"
| 8 || April  || at  || Unknown • Jonesboro, Arkansas || 7–0 || 6–2 || 2–1
|- bgcolor="#ffcccc"
| 9 || April 6 || at  || Sewell–Thomas Stadium • Tuscaloosa, Alabama || 7–15 || 6–3 || 2–2
|- bgcolor="#ccffcc"
| 10 || April 7 || at Alabama || Sewell–Thomas Stadium • Tuscaloosa, Alabama || 11–2 || 7–3 || 3–2
|- bgcolor="#ffcccc"
| 11 || April 7 || at Alabama || Sewell–Thomas Stadium • Tuscaloosa, Alabama || 13–14 || 7–4 || 3–3
|- bgcolor="#ccffcc"
| 12 || April  ||  || Swayze Field • Oxford, Mississippi || 9–3 || 8–4 || 4–3
|- bgcolor="#ccffcc"
| 13 || April  || Mississippi State || Swayze Field • Oxford, Mississippi || 14–2 || 9–4 || 5–3
|- bgcolor="#ffcccc"
| 14 || April  || at  || Unknown • New Orleans, Louisiana || 6–11 || 9–5 || 5–3
|- bgcolor="#ccffcc"
| 15 || April  || at Loyola || Unknown • New Orleans, Louisiana || 5–4 || 10–5 || 5–3
|- bgcolor="#ccffcc"
| 16 || April  || at  || Tulane Diamond • New Orleans, Louisiana || 10–17 || 11–5 || 6–3
|- bgcolor="#ccffcc"
| 17 || April  || at Tulane || Tulane Diamond • New Orleans, Louisiana || 7–1 || 12–5 || 7–3
|- bgcolor="#ccffcc"
| 18 || April  || at Tulane || Tulane Diamond • New Orleans, Louisiana || 1–0 || 13–5 || 8–3
|-

|- bgcolor="#ccffcc"
| 19 || May  ||  || Swayze Field • Oxford, Mississippi || 9–3 || 14–5 || 9–3
|- bgcolor="#ccffcc"
| 20 || May  || Vanderbilt || Swayze Field • Oxford, Mississippi|| 7–0 || 15–5 || 10–3
|- bgcolor="#ccffcc"
| 21 || May  || Vanderbilt || Swayze Field • Oxford, Mississippi || 3–0 || 16–5 || 11–3
|- bgcolor="#ccffcc"
| 22 || May  || at Mississippi State || Unknown • Starkville, Mississippi || 6–2 || 17–5 || 12–3
|- bgcolor="#ccffcc"
| 23 || May  || at Mississippi State || Unknown • Starkville, Mississippi || 8–5 || 18–5 || 13–3
|-

|-
! style="" | Postseason
|- valign="top" 

|- bgcolor="#ffcccc"
| 24 || May  || at  || Perry Field • Gainesville, Florida || 3–8 || 18–6 || 13–3
|- bgcolor="#ffcccc"
| 25 || May  || Florida || Sawyze Field • Oxford, Mississippi || 1–5 || 18–7 || 13–3
|-

|- bgcolor="#ccffcc"
| 26 || June 1 || vs  || Sims Legion Park • Gastonia, North Carolina || 4–3 || 19–7 || 13–3
|- bgcolor="#ccffcc"
| 27 || June 2 || vs Tennessee Tech || Sims Legion Park • Gastonia, North Carolina || 3–2 || 20–7 || 13–3
|- bgcolor="#ffcccc"
| 28 || June 4 || vs  || Sims Legion Park • Gastonia, North Carolina || 2–4 || 20–8 || 13–3
|- bgcolor="#ccffcc"
| 29 || June 4 || vs Duke || Sims Legion Park • Gastonia, North Carolina || 6–2 || 21–8 || 13–3
|- bgcolor="#ccffcc"
| 30 || June 4 || vs Duke || Sims Legion Park • Gastonia, North Carolina || 7–1 || 22–8 || 13–3
|-

|- bgcolor="#ccffcc"
| 31 || June 9 || vs New Hampshire || Omaha Municipal Stadium • Omaha, Nebraska || 13–12 || 23–8 || 13–3
|- bgcolor="#ccffcc"
| 32 || June 10 || vs Bradley || Omaha Municipal Stadium • Omaha, Nebraska || 4–0 || 24–8 || 13–3
|- bgcolor="#ffcccc"
| 33 || June 11 || vs Minnesota || Omaha Municipal Stadium • Omaha, Nebraska || 5–13 || 24–9 || 13–3
|- bgcolor="#ffcccc"
| 34 || June 12 || vs Arizona || Omaha Municipal Stadium • Omaha, Nebraska || 5–13 || 24–10 || 13–3
|-

Awards and honors 
Ed Crawford
All-SEC

Eagle Day
All-SEC

Joe Gibbon
All-SEC

Billy Kinard
All-SEC

Bernie Schreiber
All-SEC
All-District III Tournament Team
First Team All-America American Baseball Coaches Association

References

Ole Miss Rebels baseball seasons
Ole Miss Rebels baseball
College World Series seasons
Ole Miss